Anthony Ingham (18 February 1925 – 21 April 2010) was an English professional footballer who played more than 500 games in the Football League as a defender for Leeds United and Queens Park Rangers. He holds the appearance record for QPR, having played 548 first-team games in senior competitions.

Career
During the Second World War Ingham served in the Royal Navy. He also completed an electrical apprenticeship while playing part-time for Harrogate Town, where he made his debut in 1939/40 at the age of 14. He signed for Leeds United in the summer of 1947, and made his League debut for the club in October of the same year in a 3–2 defeat at West Bromwich Albion. However he played only rarely for The Whites, and joined Queens Park Rangers in June 1950 for a fee of £5,000.

He made his debut against Doncaster Rovers in November 1950, and retired 13 years later having made a club record 548 appearances in all senior competitions, 514 in the League. After retiring as a player in May 1963, he held various positions with QPR and went on to become a director of the club. A function room at Loftus Road is named in Ingham's honour.

Death
On 21 April 2010, Tony Ingham died of an illness at the age of 85.

References

1925 births
2010 deaths
Sportspeople from Harrogate
Royal Navy personnel of World War II
Association football defenders
English footballers
Harrogate Town A.F.C. players
Leeds United F.C. players
Queens Park Rangers F.C. players
English Football League players